Meconella denticulata is a species of flowering plant in the poppy family known by the common name smallflower fairypoppy.

It is endemic to California, where it grows in the coastal mountain ranges from around the San Francisco Bay Area to the Peninsular Ranges in the southern part of the state.

Description
Meconella denticulata is an annual herb growing up to 20 or 30 centimeters tall. The leaves are linear to oval in shape, sometimes slightly toothed, and 1 to 4 centimeters in length.

The inflorescence is a single flower on a narrow peduncle. It has usually 6 white petals each a few millimeters long.

The fruit is a narrow, twisting capsule 2 or 3 centimeters in maximum length containing many tiny seeds.

External links
Jepson Manual Treatment of Meconella denticulata
USDA Plants Profile for Meconella denticulata
Flora of North America
Meconella denticulata — U.C. Photo gallery

Papaveroideae
Endemic flora of California
Natural history of the California chaparral and woodlands
Natural history of the California Coast Ranges
Natural history of the Channel Islands of California
Natural history of the Peninsular Ranges
Natural history of the San Francisco Bay Area
Natural history of the Transverse Ranges
Taxa named by Edward Lee Greene
Flora without expected TNC conservation status